Hackensack Meridian Health (HMH) is a network of healthcare providers in New Jersey, based out of Edison. Members include academic centers, acute care facilities, and research hospitals. Hackensack Meridian Health's goal is to create one integrated network that changes how healthcare is delivered in New Jersey. The HMH network was formed in 2016 by a merger between Hackensack University Medical Center and Meridian Health. Hackensack Meridian Health is affiliated with the Hackensack Meridian School of Medicine and maintains active teaching programs at its hospitals. After the acquisition of JFK Medical Center in Edison, HMH is now the largest healthcare provider in New Jersey.

About 
As of November 2021, HMH operates 17 hospitals, 36,000 team members and more than 500  other facilities including ambulatory care centers, fitness and wellness centers, home health services, rehab centers, and skilled nursing centers spanning from Bergen to Atlantic counties. In Fall 2021, seven of its affiliate hospitals received an A grade from Hospital Safety Grade. It runs 10 clinics at Rite Aid outlets in New Jersey to treat minor health issues and make primary care physicians available for more serious conditions and urgent care needs. In 2021, U.S. News & World Report listed five of the hospitals in the HMH network as "best ranked" in New Jersey.

Technology 
HMH has in 2021 become one of the first hospital organizations to completely switch its computing hardware to ChromeOS devices and employ Google Cloud to increase cyber security and deploy machine learning and healthcare artificial intelligence to expedite diagnostic decisions and assist with clinical treatments. Artificial intelligence will reportedly assist on newborn screening, mammography screening, prostate cancer screening, sepsis detection and COVID-19 detection. The increased cyber security of its newly adopted platform responds to a ransomware attack on December 2, 2019, that compromised computer systems and forced administrators to cancel roughly 100 elective medical procedures. The attack lasted for five days and "affected anything with computer software." Administrators chose to pay the ransom of an undisclosed amount and released a statement on December 13 saying, "We believe it’s our obligation to protect our communities' access to health care."

COVID-19 response 
In 2021, the HMH network was awarded more than $100 million in funds for FEMA for emergency relief and treated more than 10,000 patients. After the CDC approved the Pfizer vaccine for children ages 5–11, the first vaccines administered to that age group were at HMH's Jersey Shore University Medical Center. HMH mandated that every of its employees be fully vaccinated by November 15, 2021. Though 70% of all health workers were vaccinated by July, 2021, there was resistance among staff partially due to concerns over vaccination causing sterility.

Philanthropy

New York Giants 
HMH and the New York Giants work together on various projects for health education, disease prevention, clinical research and philanthropic opportunities. In 2021, the MetLife Stadium Legacy Club was renamed the Hackensack Meridian Health Legacy Club at MetLife Stadium. The naming rights were formerly held by New York-Presbyterian Hospital, a former sponsor. Also in 2021, Eli Manning, a retired player for the Giants, joined HMH’s board of trustees.

HMH Foundation 
The HMH Foundation was established to oversee and make organize 10 separate, localized hospital foundations in its network. Substantial gifts in 2021 are earmarked by the donors for cardiac treatment research, COVID-19 PPE supplies, and discretionary use in meeting the HMH stated mission. An initiative of the foundation is Tackle Kids' Cancer, with funds raised for the HMH network's Joseph M. Sanzari Children’s Hospital at Hackensack University Medical Center.

Mergers and acquisitions 
In November 2006, Hackensack University Medical Center entered into a memorandum of understanding with Pascack Valley Hospital (PVH), located in Westwood, to possibly acquire the hospital from Well Care Group, Inc. On October 1, 2008, Hackensack University Medical Center North at Pascack Valley opened as "a satellite emergency department to treat non-life-threatening emergencies." It was ultimately converted in 2013 to a full-service hospital together with for-profit partner LHP Hospital Group (now Ardent Health Services) .

On September 9, 2020, HMH announced a ten-year partnership with American Dream in East Rutherford. The partnership includes opening a urgent care center at the complex, helping the complex reopen during the COVID-19 pandemic in New Jersey, and having pop-up events at American Dream about health and wellness.

In September, 2014 HMH signed a letter of intent with administrators from Raritan Bay Medical Center (RBMC) to explore options for a merger. At that time, RBMC was facing increased financial pressure. On January 1, 2016, the merger was completed.

On May 12, 2015, HMH and Hackensack University Medical Center signed a definitive agreement to merge pending regulatory approval. The merger finalized in 2016.

On January 3, 2019, HMH finalized a merger with Carrier Clinic, a psychiatric healthcare provider. Plans for the merger established behavioral health urgent care centers throughout New Jersey and set up tele-psychiatry services. HMH also promised to invest $25 million in the Belle Mead campus for upgraded infrastructure, technology and expansion of services provided.

On October 15, 2019, HMH announced a merger with Englewood Health, a healthcare provider in Bergen County. HMH agreed to invest $400 million into the facility. As of 2021, the merger is currently pending approval from the Federal Trade Commission and New Jersey state officials. The investment included new operating rooms, additional outpatient care facilities and larger cardiac catheterization labs. The affiliation also included an expanded academic partnership with the Hackensack Meridian School of Medicine. The merger enabled Englewood to become a tertiary academic medical center. In December 2020, it was announced that the Federal Trade Commission would be suing HMH to block the merger due to monopolistic practices. The planned merger between HMH and Englewood Health was called off in 2022.

List of hospitals

See also 

 RWJBarnabas Health
 Seton Hall University
 Atlantic Health System

References

External links

Annual reports

Healthcare in New Jersey
Edison, New Jersey
Companies based in Middlesex County, New Jersey
Hospital networks in the United States
Health care companies based in New Jersey